John Elmore Musick (c. 1925 – November 27, 1977) was an American football player and  coach.  He served as the head football coach at Cornell University from 1966 to 1974.

Musick played as a lineman at the University of Southern California (USC) from 1944 to 1946. In 1947 he became an assistant coach under Bob Blackman at Monrovia High School in Monrovia, California and then followed him to Pasadena City College in 1949. In 1951 Musick became head coach at Hart High School. In 1953, he rejoined Bob Blackman at University of Denver where he served as head line coach. Musick worked in that capacity under Blackman for the next 13 years, including 11 after 1955 when both were hired by Dartmouth College. Dartmouth won four Ivy League titles with Musick coaching under Blackman.

After replacing Tom Harp at Cornell, Musick won Cornell's first official Ivy League title in 1971, and coached top rusher Ed Marinaro. In 1971 Musick was also named Division I Coach of the Year by the American Football Coaches Association. However, after back-to-back losing seasons in 1973 and 1974, and several recruiting scandals hit other sports at Cornell, Musick was terminated by the university at the end of the 1974 season. His final record was 45–33–3.

Musick died at the age of 52 on November 27, 1977 of cancer at a hospital in Clear Lake, Texas.

Head coaching record

College

References

Additional sources
 Article describing Musick's hiring

1920s births
1977 deaths
USC Trojans football players
Cornell Big Red football coaches
Dartmouth Big Green football coaches
Denver Pioneers football coaches
High school football coaches in California
Pasadena City Lancers football coaches
Sportspeople from Santa Ana, California
Players of American football from California
Deaths from cancer in Texas